Carvalhas is a Portuguese freguesia ("civil parish"), located in the municipality of Barcelos.

References

Freguesias of Barcelos, Portugal